Callitrichine gammaherpesvirus 3 (CalHV-3) is a species of virus that infects marmosets. It is in the genus Lymphocryptovirus, subfamily Gammaherpesvirinae, family Herpesviridae, and order Herpesvirales,.

References 

Gammaherpesvirinae